John Gerard Senden (born 20 April 1971) is an Australian professional golfer who plays on the PGA Tour.

Senden was born in Brisbane, Queensland and turned pro in 1992. Senden has played all over the world. He is a regular competitor on the PGA Tour of Australasia and has spent time playing in Asia. In Europe he won twice on the second tier Challenge Tour in 1998 and was a member of the main European Tour from 1999 to 2001.

In 2002, Senden joined the PGA Tour in the United States, after coming through the qualifying school in 2001. During his first year on tour he successfully kept his playing status with eight top-25 finishes in 30 events. He claimed his first PGA Tour title on 16 July 2006 at the John Deere Classic, a one-shot victory over American J. P. Hayes. Later in 2006 he won his national open for the first time. In 2007, he was the leading Australian at the PGA Championship which was won by Tiger Woods and reached the top 50 of the Official World Golf Ranking.

In March 2014, Senden won his second PGA Tour title (and first in eight years) at the Valspar Championship by one stroke over Kevin Na. In the final round, he came from two strokes back to shoot a one-under 70 to seal victory. The win qualified Senden for the 2014 Masters Tournament where he finished T-8.

Senden's son was diagnosed with a brain tumor in April 2017. Senden played the next two seasons using a Major Medical Extension under the family crisis provision, but he was unable to meet the terms and was demoted to the Past Champions Category. He played the 2019-20 season using an exemption for those who made 300 PGA Tour cuts.

Professional wins (6)

PGA Tour wins (2)

PGA Tour of Australasia wins (1)

Challenge Tour wins (2)

Challenge Tour playoff record (1–1)

Other wins (1)

Playoff record
Asian Tour playoff record (0–1)

Results in major championships

CUT = missed the halfway cut
"T" indicates a tie for a place.

Summary

Most consecutive cuts made – 5 (2012 U.S. Open – 2013 U.S. Open)
Longest streak of top-10s – 1 (three times)

Results in The Players Championship

CUT = missed the halfway cut
"T" indicates a tie for a place

Results in World Golf Championships
Results not in chronological order prior to 2015.

QF, R16, R32, R64 = Round in which player lost in match play
"T" = Tied
Note that the HSBC Champions did not become a WGC event until 2009.

Results in senior major championships

CUT = missed the halfway cut
"T" indicates a tie for a place

Team appearances
World Cup (representing Australia): 2006

See also
2001 PGA Tour Qualifying School graduates

References

External links

John Senden player profile, Golf Australia

Australian male golfers
PGA Tour of Australasia golfers
European Tour golfers
PGA Tour golfers
Asian Tour golfers
Golfers from Brisbane
1971 births
Living people